Dizaj-e Rahim Pur (also Romanized as Dīzaj-e Raḩīm Pūr and Dīzaj-e Raḩīmpūr) is a village in Baranduz Rural District, in the Central District of Urmia County, West Azerbaijan Province, Iran. At the 2006 census, its population was 113, in 28 families.

References 

Populated places in Urmia County